Philippe Boutros Chebaya (born May 20, 1920 in Bsharri, Lebanon - died on 8 October 2002) was the first Maronite bishop in 1990 of the newly established Maronite Catholic Eparchy of Baalbek-Deir El Ahmar in Lebanon.

Life

On March 25, 1944 Philippe Boutros Chabaya was ordained to the priesthood in the Maronite Catholic Eparchy of Batroun. His appointment as first bishop of Baalbek-Deir El Ahmar took place on 9 June 1990. Maronite Patriarch of Antioch Cardinal Nasrallah Boutros Sfeir ordained Chebaya bishop on August 5, 1990 and his co-consecrators were Roland Aboujaoudé, Auxiliary Bishop of Antioch and Bishop Georges Abi-Saber, OLM, also Auxiliary Bishop of Antioch. His retirement as bishop by age-related reasons was on June 10, 1995. Until his death on October 8, 2002, he was Emeritus bishop of Baalbek-Deir El-Ahmar. His successor was Paul-Mounged El-Hachem.

See also
Catholic Church in Lebanon

References

External links
 http://www.catholic-hierarchy.org/bishop/bchebaya.html 
 http://www.gcatholic.org/dioceses/diocese/baal1.htm

1920 births
2002 deaths
People from Bsharri
Lebanese Maronites
20th-century Maronite Catholic bishops